The Lola B03/51 is an open-wheel formula racing car, designed, developed and built by Lola for the Japanese Formula Nippon championship series, in 2003. It was powered by a naturally aspirated  Mugen MF308 engine that produced around  @ 13,500 rpm.

References

Open wheel racing cars
Super Formula cars
Lola racing cars